Igor Djoman (born May 1, 1986 in Clermont) is a French professional footballer who plays as a midfielder for Kuwaiti club Al Tadamon.

Career
Djoman played one season for Amiens B, before spending six seasons with Guingamp, where he earned 43 appearances for the first team. He made his Ligue 2 debut in a 2–0 away loss against Sedan on 12 May 2006, coming on as a substitute. Djoman scored his only league goal for Guingamp on 29 September 2006, in a 1–3 home loss against SM Caen.

On 26 February 2013, Djoman signed with Bulgarian side Beroe Stara Zagora on a one-and-a-half-year deal. He made his debut in a 0–0 away draw against Botev Vratsa on 2 March.

In September 2017, Djoman joined Gibraltarian club Gibraltar United. He made his debut on 25 September in a 2–0 home win against Lynx, coming on as substitute for Jamie Bosio.

Career statistics
.

Honours

Club
Guingamp
Coupe de France (1): 2008–09

Beroe
Bulgarian Cup (1): 2012–13
Bulgarian Supercup (1):  2013

References

External links
 
 

1986 births
Living people
French footballers
French expatriate footballers
French sportspeople of Beninese descent
Ligue 2 players
First Professional Football League (Bulgaria) players
En Avant Guingamp players
Vendée Poiré-sur-Vie Football players
PFC Beroe Stara Zagora players
FC Lokomotiv Gorna Oryahovitsa players
Gibraltar United F.C. players
French expatriate sportspeople in Bulgaria
Expatriate footballers in Bulgaria
Expatriate footballers in Gibraltar
Association football midfielders
French expatriate sportspeople in Gibraltar
Black French sportspeople